God's Great Banana Skin is the twelfth studio album by British singer-songwriter Chris Rea, released in 1992. The album was not released in the United States, though some tracks later appeared on the US release of Rea's following album Espresso Logic. The single "Nothing To Fear" reached number 16 in the UK Singles Chart, and its music video was filmed in Morocco. The album reached number 4 in the UK Albums Chart in 1992.

The song "Too Much Pride" was featured in the 1993 erotic thriller, Cold Sweat.

Critical reception

The Guardian wrote: "In the snug world of centrally-heated adult rock, Chris Rea offers a reminder that he plays a handy slide-guitar, and creates chunky chordscapes which perfectly complement the gravelly rasp of his voice."

Track listing
All songs by Chris Rea.
 "Nothing to Fear" – 9:10
 "Miles Is a Cigarette" – 4:15
 "God's Great Banana Skin" – 5:15
 "90's Blues" – 5:10
 "Too Much Pride" – 4:25
 "Boom Boom" – 5:10
 "I Ain't the Fool" – 4:00
 "There She Goes" – 4:35
 "I'm Ready" – 4:50
 "Black Dog" – 4:10
 "Soft Top, Hard Shoulder" – 4:30

Personnel 
 Chris Rea – vocals, guitars
 Robert Ahwai – guitars
 Max Middleton – acoustic piano, keyboards
 Sylvin Marc – bass
 Martin Ditcham – drums, percussion
 Val Chalmers – backing vocals
 Emma Whittle – backing vocals

Production 
 Chris Rea – producer
 Neil Amor – engineer
 Phillipe Garcia – assistant engineer
 Simon Wall – assistant engineer
 Tommy Willis – guitar technician 
 Chris Welch – illustrations
 Paul Lilly – management

Studios
 Recorded at Studio Miraval (Le Var, France)
 Mixed at The Mill (Berkshire, England)

Charts

Certifications

References 

1992 albums
Chris Rea albums
East West Records albums